The University of Michigan is a public research university located in Ann Arbor, Michigan.

The University of Michigan may also refer to two satellite campuses:
University of Michigan–Dearborn located in Dearborn, Michigan
University of Michigan–Flint located in Flint, Michigan

See also
 Michigan State University